John Bettinson (born 10 December 1940) is a former British cyclist. He competed in the team time trial at the 1968 Summer Olympics.

References

1940 births
Living people
English male cyclists
Olympic cyclists of Great Britain
Cyclists at the 1968 Summer Olympics
Sportspeople from Barrow-in-Furness